Crouching Tiger Hidden Ghost (Chinese: 卧虎藏鬼) is a Singaporean dramedy produced and telecast on Mediacorp Channel 8. It stars Jesseca Liu, Bonnie Loo, Zong Zijie and Jeremy Chan.

Cast

Main
Jesseca Liu as Lin Xiao Fang
Bonnie Loo as Angie
Zong Zijie as Ah Lun
Jeremy Chan as Ma Da

Supporting
Ian Fang as Xie Weixiang
Sora Ma as Ah Jie
Allan Wu as Evan Lau
Teddy Tang as Jeffrey Tan

Guest and minor
Tay Ping Hui as Ralph Lee
Darren Lim as Ah Kun
Eelyn Kok as Emily Tan
Lina Ng as Leong
Huang Jianshun as Zhou Xiaoji
Xenia as Zhou Xiayun
Mo Junxuan as Iceboy
CKay Lim as Mr. Ho
Xixi Lim as Ying Hou
Jalyn Han as Grandma
Cassandra See as Lina
Regina Lim as Selena
Benjamin Josiah Tan as Lucas

References

2020s Singaporean television series
2021 Singaporean television series debuts
Mediacorp Chinese language programmes